Harold Fairburn CMG, KPM (1884-1973) was the Inspector-General of the Straits Settlements Police in Singapore, from 1925 to 1935.

Career
He joined the Straits Settlements Police as a cadet in 1904 and spent a twenty-month training period in China, where cadets learnt Mandarin and gained an understanding of Chinese culture. He went on to become the first police cadet to be made an Inspector-General when he succeeded G.C. Denham in 1925. With the support of Sir Hugh Clifford, the Governor of the Straits Settlements, he initiated an extensive reorganization of the police force. This included the construction of new police stations and officer's barracks, many of which remain as distinctive landmarks in Singapore.

Recognition
He is recognized for many improvements that were made in the working conditions of serving officers. In the years following World War I the rising level of inflation had significantly reduced the value of wages, which led to an increase in the amount of debt amongst junior officers. In 1926, he became the president and adviser to the Singapore Police Cooperative Thrift and Loan Society, which gave officers their own collective credit scheme and helped them to manage savings. He retired in 1935 and René Onraet was named as Inspector-General.

References

See also
Commissioner of Police (Singapore)

British colonial police officers
1884 births
1973 deaths
Companions of the Order of St Michael and St George
Colonial recipients of the Queen's Police Medal
British people in British Malaya
British expatriates in China